Jane Marken (born Jeanne Berthe Adolphine Crabbe, sometimes credited as Jeanne Marken, 13 January 1895 in Paris 10th arrondissement – 1 December 1976 in Paris 4th arrondissement) was a French actress. She was the first wife of the actor Jules Berry.

Marken began her film career under the aegis of Abel Gance in 1915. She made several films with Marcel Carné including Hotel du Nord (1938), and as Madame Hermine, the hotelier (a comic role) in Les Enfants du Paradis (Children of Paradise, 1945). She also appeared in films of Julien Duvivier, Jacques Becker, Sacha Guitry, Renoir's Partie de campagne (A Day in the Country 1936), Yves Allégret's Une si jolie petite plage (1949) and Manèges (1950), Dr. Knock (1951), The Turkey (1951), and in Roger Vadim's And God Created Woman (1956). Her last appearance was in L'Humeur vagabonde (1971), directed by Édouard Luntz.

Selected filmography

 Fioritures (1916) - Anny Dorleville
 Géo, le mystérieux (1917) - Ginette Dorville
 Madame et son filleul (1919)
 Chouquette et son as (1920) - Chouquette
 Ce cochon de Morin (1932)
 The Ironmaster (1933)
 Court Waltzes (La guerre des valses, 1933)
 La dame aux camélias (1934) - Prudence
 Ferdinand le noceur (1935) - Mme Bertimey
 Napoléon Bonaparte (1935) - Marie-Anne
 Le chemineau (1935) - Catherine
 La marmaille (1935)
 La Garçonne (1936)
 Beethoven's Great Love (1936) - Esther Frechet - la cuisinière
 L'homme à abattre (1937)
 L'ange du foyer (1937) - Augustine
 Lady Killer (Gueule d'amour, 1937) - Madame Cailloux
 Remontons les Champs-Élysées (1938) - La mère de Louisette
 Three Waltzes (Les trois valses, 1938) - Céleste
 Hôtel du Nord (1938) - Louise Lecouvreur
 There's No Tomorrow (1939) - Mme Béchu (uncredited)
 Paradise Lost (1940) - Madame Bonneron - la concierge
 The Marvelous Night (La nuit merveilleuse, 1940) - Mathilde, l'hôtelière
 La prière aux étoiles (1941)
 A Woman in the Night (1943) - Madame Béghin
 Two Timid Souls (1943) - Tante Valérie
 Summer Light (1943) - Louise Martinet
 Love Eternal (L'Éternel retour, 1943) - Anne
 Adrien (1943) - Madame Hortense
 Les Petites du quai aux fleurs (1944) - Madame Chaussin (uncredited)
 Children of Paradise (1945) - Mme Hermine
 Paris Frills (1945) - Mme Lesurque, la tante de Micheline (uncredited)
 Land Without Stars (1946) - La secrétaire
 The Idiot (L'idiot, 1946) - Naria
 The Eternal Husband (1946) - Amélie Zakhlebinine
 Night Warning (Nuits d'alerte, 1946) - Madame Morizot
 Pétrus (1946) - Mme Portal, la charcutière
 Gates of the Night (1946) - Mme Germaine
 The Beautiful Trip (1947) - La femme d'Albert
 Copie conforme (1947) - La concierge
 Love Around the House (1947) - Madame Jobic
 L'arche de Noé (1947) - Christine Pelpail
 Route sans issue (1948) - Tante Agathe
 Parade du rire (1948) - Mme de Saint-Jules
 Scandals of Clochemerle (1948) - La baronne de Courtebiche
 Dédée d'Anvers (1948) - Germaine
 Night Express (1948) - Mme Louis
 The Woman I Murdered (1948) - Maria Le Querrec
 Une si jolie petite plage (1949) - Madame Mahieu
 The Ladies in the Green Hats (Ces dames aux chapeaux verts, 1949) - Rosalie Davernis
 The Secret of Mayerling (1949) - La baronne Hélène Vetsera
 Return to Life (1949) - Tante Berthe (segment 1 : "Le retour de tante Emma")
 Manèges (1950) - La mère de Dora
 La Marie du port (1950) - Madame Josselin - la patronne du bar
 Lady Paname (1950) - Madame Gambier
 Chéri (1950) - Charlotte Peloux
 Ma pomme (1950) - Mme Deply
 Darling Caroline (1951) - Cathy, la nourrice
 Dr. Knock (Knock, 1951) - Mme Parpalaid
 The Passerby (La Passante, 1951) - Mme. Pomont
 Boîte de nuit (1951) - Irma
 Sins of Madeleine (1951) - Mme Antonine
 Two Pennies Worth of Violets (1951) - Madame Dubreck
 Chacun son tour (1951) - Mme Lepage
 The Turkey (1951) - Madame Pinchard
 Et ta soeur (1951) - Amélie
 The Man in My Life (L'Homme de ma vie, 1952) - Emma
 Monsieur Leguignon, Signalman (1952) - Mme. Leguignon
 Mister Taxi (Monsieur Taxi, 1952) - Tante Louise
 A Mother's Secret (1952) - Rosa
 Crazy for Love (Le Trou normand, 1952) - Augustine Lemoine, la tante
 Companions of the Night (Les Compagnes de la nuit, 1953) - Madame Anita
 Captain Pantoufle (Capitaine Pantoufle, 1953) - Madame Cauchard
 Maternité clandestine (1953) - La tante de Jacques
 Leguignon the Healer (1954) - Mme Leguignon
 Chiens perdus sans collier (1955) - La déléguée
 Tant qu'il y aura des femmes (1955)
 Marie Antoinette Queen of France (1956) - Mme Victoire
 Pity for the Vamps (1956) - Mme Edith
 And God Created Woman (1956) - Madame Morin
 Les 3 font la paire (1957) - Georgette Bornier
 L'auberge en folie (1957) - Mme. Portafaux
 L'inspecteur aime la bagarre (1957) - Nène Thierry
 Lovers of Paris (1957) - Eléonore Josserand
 Women's Prison (1958) - Mme Rémon, la belle-mère d'Alice
 Life Together (1958) - Madame Fourneau
 Le Miroir à deux faces (1958) - Madame Vauzange
 Maxime (1958) - Coco Naval
 Ce corps tant désiré (1959) - Mme Féraud
 The Road to Shame (1959) - Mme. Cassini
 Il fiore e la violenza (1962) - Juliette Dufur (segment "La scapagnata")
 La Bonne Soupe (1964) - Mme Alphonse
 Patate (1964) - Berthe

External links

1895 births
1976 deaths
20th-century French actresses
French film actresses
French silent film actresses